Coppers is a British fly-on-the-wall documentary television series broadcast on Channel 4, about policing in the United Kingdom. First broadcast on 1 November 2010, the series followed the day-to-day lives of police officers (colloquially known as 'coppers') from four territorial police forces around the country, covering various activities: custody suite operations, road unit policing, 999 response, night time policing and riot control.

A second and final series began on 9 January 2012 and ran for 8 episodes.

Concept
The premise of the series was presented by the producers as follows:

This referred to the impending cuts in police force budgets as a result of the 2010 Spending Review, the results of which were announced in October 2010, just before the show aired.

The series follows a reality television documentary style. Each episode features only a small amount of narration, and the majority of screen time is devoted to on location filming with interaction to camera from the police officers being filmed. This is supplemented with footage of officers talking to camera in a more formal setting, with minimal input by an interviewer. At the end of each episode, there is a summary of the outcome of the cases of many of the police officers and offenders featured.

Broadcast 
The first series was broadcast as five one-hour episodes on Channel 4 on Monday nights in the 9 pm timeslot.
The second and final series was broadcast as eight one-hour episodes on Channel 4 on Monday nights in the 9 pm timeslot.

Episodes

Series 1

Series 2

See also
 24 Hours in Police Custody

External links 
 
 Coppers at Channel 4
 Coppers Series 1 at Blast! Films
 Coppers Series 2 at Blast! Films

2010 British television series debuts
2012 British television series endings
2010s British documentary television series
2010s British crime television series
Channel 4 documentary series
Documentary television series about policing
English-language television shows
Law enforcement in England and Wales